Thomas Patterson (born 16 September 1839, date of death unknown) was an Australian cricketer. He played one first-class match for Tasmania in 1858.

See also
 List of Tasmanian representative cricketers

References

External links
 

1839 births
Year of death missing
Australian cricketers
Tasmania cricketers
Cricketers from Hobart